David Campbell Wilson is an American screenwriter, probably best known for creating The Perfect Weapon and Supernova. He also credited for the screenplay of Terminator Salvation in early promotional material, but not for the final cut of the film.

Mr. Wilson has worked with many directors, among them Francis Ford Coppola, John McTiernan, and Walter Hill.  Most recently, he wrote the screen story for Guy Ritchie's adaptation of The Man from U.N.C.L.E..

Filmography
 The Perfect Weapon (1991)
 Supernova (2000)
 Terminator Salvation (2009) (uncredited)
 The Man from U.N.C.L.E. (2015) (co-story)

References

External links

American male screenwriters
Living people
Year of birth missing (living people)
Place of birth missing (living people)